Bone Head is an album by the rock group Half Japanese, released in 1997.

Critical reception
The Chicago Tribune called the album "one of [the band's] best efforts to date: 21 infectious, sharply-etched rock miniatures scribbled with noise yet layered with hooks."

Track listing

CD version

References 

1997 albums
Half Japanese albums
Alternative Tentacles albums